Joseph M. Lyons is an American politician and former Democratic member of the Illinois House of Representatives. He served from 1996 until 2013 representing the 15th, and later 19th, district.

Biography
Lyons was born June 24, 1951, in Chicago. His uncle is Thomas G. Lyons, who served as Chairman of the Cook County Democratic Party from 1990 to 1997. He earned a bachelor's degree in political science and history from DePaul University in 1975. He was a supervisor in the Chicago Water Department from 1975 until 1981. He worked for the Regional Transportation Authority for a year in 1980. He then took a position with the Cook County Department of Human Resources.

In the 1996 Democratic primary, he ran and won a four-way primary to succeed William Laurino in the 15th district. He was appointed to the Illinois House of Representatives August 12, 1996 after he won the Democratic nomination. After the 2001 decennial redistricting process, Lyons was redistricted to the 19th district. He was the Chair of the Chicago White Sox Caucus. Lyons chose to retire after the 97th Illinois General Assembly in 2011–2012. At the time of his retirement he was the Assistant Majority Leader.

He was succeeded by Robert Martwick.

References

External links
Illinois General Assembly - Representative Joseph M. Lyons (D) 19th District official IL House website
Bills Committees
Project Vote Smart - Representative Joseph M. 'Joe' Lyons (IL) profile
Follow the Money - Joseph M Lyons
2006 2004 2002 2000 1998 1996 campaign contributions
Illinois House Democrats - Joseph M. Lyons profile

1951 births
Living people
Democratic Party members of the Illinois House of Representatives
DePaul University alumni
Politicians from Chicago
21st-century American politicians